This Little Empire is the second (and last) studio album by New Zealand rock band Zed. It was produced by Sylvia Massy Shivy and Zed at Radiostar Studios in Weed, California, and engineered by Rich Veltrop and assisted by Josh Kiser. Unlike the band's debut 2000 release, Silencer, This Little Empire was predominantly produced for the American market, with a US edition and a New Zealand edition released. The track listing for the US edition contains tracks taken from their debut album. The album was released to the New Zealand market on November 11, 2003; and released internationally on August 23, 2004, via Interscope Records.

Chart performance
This Little Empire debuted in the Official New Zealand Top 40 Albums chart on November 9, 2003.  It spent three weeks within the top ten and peaked at #4. The album spent a total of 13 weeks on the chart.

Track listing

Personnel
Zed
 Nathan King – vocals, guitar
 Ben Campbell – bass, vocals
 Andrew "Andy" Lynch – guitar, vocals, engineering
 Adrian Palmer – drums, percussion

Production
 Sylvia Massy Shivy – producer
 Rich Veltrop – engineering
 Josh Kiser - assistant engineer
 Clint Murphy – additional engineering
 Rivers Cuomo – composer
 Brian Wilson – composer
 Roger Christian – composer
 C. Brooks – composer
 M. Barus – composer
 Clif Norrell – mixing
 Robert Orton – mixing (track 2)
 Martin Kierszenbaum – additional production (track 2)
 Malcolm Welsford – producer, engineering, mixing (track 5)
 George Marino – mastering (track 5)

Additional personnel
 Martin Kierszenbaum – A&R director
 Andrea Ruffalo – A&R co-ordinator
 Robert Hayes – management
 A. Kim Guggenheim – legal representative
 Steve Strange – agent
 Kevin Soh – concept, art direction and design
 Simon Oosterdijk – concept, art direction and design
 Aaron K. – photography
 Karen Inderbitzen-Waller – styling

Credits for This Little Empire adapted from liner notes.

Certifications

References

2003 albums
Zed (band) albums
Interscope Records albums
Albums produced by Sylvia Massy